McIntire Ranch, in Conejos County, Colorado near Sanford, Colorado, was listed on the National Register of Historic Places in 2008.  The listing included the remains of ranch buildings on a  area.

The site is in the southern end of the San Luis Valley on land now administered by the Bureau of Land Management's La Jara Field Office, "on a low, sloping bench that overlooks a series of small ponds to the west in the foreground and the Conejos River in the distance."

The main house was a Territorial Adobe structure built of adobe blocks.

References

Ranches in Colorado
National Register of Historic Places in Conejos County, Colorado
Late 19th and Early 20th Century American Movements architecture
Buildings and structures completed in 1880